Randy Gardner  may refer to:

 Randy Gardner (born c. 1946), subject of the Randy Gardner sleep deprivation experiment
 Randy Gardner (figure skater) (born 1958), American pair skater
 Randy Gardner (politician) (born 1958), member of the Ohio House of Representatives